Electoral district of Brunswick West was an electoral district of the Legislative Assembly in the Australian state of Victoria.

Members for Brunswick West

The Electoral district of Brunswick was re-created in 1976 with Tom Roper being the member 1976–1992.

Election results

References
Re-Member database Parliament of Victoria

Former electoral districts of Victoria (Australia)
1955 establishments in Australia
1976 disestablishments in Australia